The 2011 IIHF World U20 Championship, commonly referred to as the 2011 World Junior Hockey Championships (2011 WJHC), was the 35th edition of the Ice Hockey World Junior Championship and was hosted by the United States. The games were played in Western New York, at HSBC Arena in Buffalo and Niagara University's Dwyer Arena in Lewiston. Russia won the gold medal with a 5–3 victory over Canada in the championship game, after completing the biggest comeback in the WJHC history; being down 3–0 after two periods, the Russians scored five goals in the third period to capture their first WJHC gold medal since 2003. The host team, the United States, won the bronze medal with a 4–2 win over Sweden.

Bid process 
Co-host of the 2005 tournament, Grand Forks, North Dakota, also submitted a bid to host the 2011 tournament. In addition, Detroit was mentioned as a possible host city.

Venues

Summary

Exhibition games 
A series of five exhibition games were held between several of the teams at Sports Centre at MCC in Brighton, New York and the Jamestown Savings Bank Ice Arena in Jamestown, New York in conjunction with, and immediately prior to, the tournament.

Preliminary round 
The Preliminary Round robin consisted of two pools of five teams each, played in a round robin format. The United States (Pool A) and Sweden (Pool B) went undefeated to finish first in their respective pools and earn an automatic berth in the semifinals. To qualify for the quarterfinals, Canada and Russia finished second and third in Pool B while Finland and Switzerland did likewise in Pool A. The remaining teams, Slovakia, Germany, Czech Republic and Norway, were sent to the relegation round.

Relegation round 
In the relegation round, Slovakia and Norway played in the first game, with Slovakia winning 5–0.  The Czech Republic defeated Germany 3–2 in the second game.  After the first day of action, the final results were decided and the remaining games were meaningless.  Germany lost to Norway 3–1 and the Czech Republic defeated Slovakia 5–2 in the final relegation games.  Norway and Germany were relegated to Division I for the 2012 tournament.

Medal round

Quarterfinals 
The first quarterfinal game saw Russia take on Finland. Russia trailed by two goals late in the game, but scored twice to tie and send it to overtime. Evgeny Kuznetsov scored the game-winning goal in overtime. In the other quarterfinal, Canada easily defeated Switzerland 4–1.

Semifinals 
The first semi-final featured Russia and Sweden. Controversy erupted in the second period as an apparent icing call on Russia was waved off by the on-ice officials, allowing the Russians to score and take a 2–0 lead. The Swedish team protested the non-call, but the goal stood. The Swedes did forge a comeback and took a 3–2 lead in the third period, but the Russians scored late to force overtime for the second consecutive game. The game went to a shootout with Russia winning, 4–3. The second semifinal was a highly anticipated rematch of the previous year's gold medal game between Canada and the United States, the defending champions.  In front of a mainly Canadian crowd that made the trip to Buffalo, Canada earned a berth in the final with a 4–1 victory over their American rivals.

Fifth place game 
The fifth place game featured the losing teams of the quarter-final games. Switzerland defeated Finland 3–2 in a shootout to take fifth place.

Bronze medal game 
The United States defeated Sweden 4–2 to win the bronze medal, its first ever WJHC medal on home ice.

Gold medal game 
The gold medal game was between Canada and Russia. The game marked Canada's tenth consecutive appearance in the final. The Russians had lost their three previous gold medal games to Canada. Canada led 3-0 after two periods. However, the Russians scored five unanswered goals in the third period, including two in a span of 13 seconds, to win the game 5–3 and capture the gold medal. It was Russia's first gold medal since 2003 and Canada's second straight silver medal finish. Brayden Schenn of Canada was named the tournament's Most Valuable Player.

The game delivered one of the largest television audiences in Canadian history, with an average of 6.88 million viewers watching on TSN and another 652,000 watching the French-language broadcast on RDS.  An estimated half of Canadians watched a portion or all of the game.

Top division

Rosters

Preliminary round

Group A 

All times local (EST/UTC−5)

Group B 

All times local (EST/UTC−5)

Relegation round 
The results from matches between teams from the same group in the preliminary round were carried forward to this round.

All times local (EST/UTC−5)

Final round 

* Decided in Overtime.

** Decided in Shootout.

Quarterfinals

Semifinals

5th place playoff

Bronze medal game

Gold medal game

Scoring leaders

Goaltending leaders 
(minimum 40% team's total ice time)

Tournament awards

Most Valuable Player
  Brayden Schenn

All-star team

 Goaltender:  Jack Campbell
 Defencemen:  Ryan Ellis,  Dmitri Orlov
 Forwards:  Brayden Schenn,  Ryan Johansen,  Evgeny Kuznetsov

IIHF best player awards

 Goaltender:  Jack Campbell
 Defenceman:  Ryan Ellis
 Forward:  Brayden Schenn

Final standings

Division I 

The following teams took part in the Division I tournament. Group A was played in Babruysk, Belarus, between December 13 and December 19, 2010. Group B was played in Bled, Slovenia, between December 12 and December 18, 2010.

Group A

Group B

Division II 

The following teams took part in the Division II tournament. Group A was played in Tallinn, Estonia. Group B was played in Miercurea-Ciuc, Romania, between December 13 and December 19, 2010.

Group A

Group B

Division III

Rosters

References

External links
 Buffalo World Junior Hockey Championship Website
 2011 IIHF World U20 Championship Website

 
2011
World Junior Ice Hockey Championships, 2011
2010
World Junior Championships
Sports competitions in Buffalo, New York
Sports in Jamestown, New York
Sports in Rochester, New York
World Junior Ice Hockey Championships
World Junior Ice Hockey Championships
World Junior Ice Hockey Championships
World Junior Ice Hockey Championships
International sports competitions in New York (state)